Chrysorthenches virgata is a species of moth in the family Plutellidae. It was first described by Alfred Philpott in 1920. It is endemic to New Zealand and has been found in the North, South and Chatham Islands at altitudes ranging from sea-level up to approximately 1000 m. This species inhabits areas where its larval host plants, Libocedrus bidwillii and Cupressus macrocarpa are common. The larvae feed on the leaves of their hosts from under a silk shelter and pupate in a cocoon of thick silk covered in frass. Adult moths are on the wing from September to February as well as in April and June.

Taxonomy 
This species was first described by Alfred Philpott in 1920 and named Orthenches virgata.  George Hudson discussed and illustrated this species in his 1928 book The butterflies and moths of New Zealand and again discussed the species in his 1939 book A Supplement to the butterflies and moths of New Zealand. In 1996 John S. Dugdale placed this species in the genus Chrysorthenches. The female lectotype, collected in Auckland by Alfred Jefferis Turner, is held at the New Zealand Arthropod Collection.

Description

Dugdale described the larvae of this species as follows:

Philpott described the adult female of this species as follows:

The larvae can be distinguished from the similar looking larvae of C. argentea as C. virgata larvae lack the zigzag colour pattern. The adult moths can be distinguished from their New Zealand sister species as they have a bright ginger colouration of their forewings.

Distribution 
This species is endemic to New Zealand and has been found in the North, South and Chatham Islands. It can be found at altitudes ranging from sea level to approximately 1050 m, the upper altitudinal limit of its host species Libocedrus bidwillii.

Behaviour
The larvae of this species feeds on the leaves of its host under a silk shelter. It pupates within a cocoon of thickly woven silk covered in frass. Adults have been observed from September to February as well as in April and June.

Host species 

The larval host species of C. virgata are Libocedrus bidwillii and Cupressus macrocarpa.

DNA analysis 
In 2020 this species along with the other species in the genus Chrysorthenches had their DNA and morphological characters studied.

References

Moths described in 1920
Plutellidae
Moths of New Zealand
Endemic fauna of New Zealand
Taxa named by Alfred Philpott
Endemic moths of New Zealand